Bisexual conferences and organizations seek to promote understanding and acceptance, both legally and socially, of bisexual persons.

International
 International Conference on Bisexuality

United Kingdom
 BiCon (UK)
 BiFest
 BiPhoria

United States
 American Institute of Bisexuality
 Bay Area Bisexual Network
 Bialogue
 BiNet USA
 Bisexual Queer Alliance Chicago
 Bisexual Resource Center
 Bisexual Social Network
 National Bisexual Liberation Group
 New York Area Bisexual Network
 Transcending Boundaries Conference,  New England

See also

 Bisexual community
 Bisexuality in the United States
 List of LGBT-related organizations

External links
 List of bisexual organizations from the Open Directory Project

Bisexuality
 
Bisexuality-related lists